Acrotmarus is a monotypic genus of Asian crab spiders containing the single species, Acrotmarus gummosus. It was first described by G. Tang & S. Q. Li in 2012, and is found in China.

See also
 List of Thomisidae species

References

Monotypic Araneomorphae genera
Spiders of China
Thomisidae